Michel Pierre Talagrand (born 15 February 1952) is a French mathematician. Docteur ès sciences since 1977, he has been, since 1985, Directeur de Recherches at CNRS and a member of the  Functional Analysis Team of the Institut de Mathématique of Paris. Talagrand was elected as correspondent of the Académie des sciences of Paris in March 1997, and then as a full member in November 2004, in the Mathematics section.

Talagrand studies mainly functional analysis and probability theory and their applications.

Scientific activity

Talagrand has been interested in probability with minimal structure. He has obtained a complete characterization of bounded Gaussian processes in very general settings, and also new methods
to bound stochastic processes. He discovered new aspects of the isoperimetric and concentration of measure phenomena for product spaces, by obtaining inequalities which make use of new kind of distances between a point and a subset of a product space. These inequalities show in great generality that a random quantity which depends on many independent variables, without depending too much on one of them, does have only small fluctuations. These inequalities helped to solve most classical problems in probability theory on Banach spaces, and have also transformed the abstract theory of stochastic processes. These inequalities have been successfully used in many applications involving stochastic quantities, like for instance in statistical mechanics (disordered systems), theoretical computer science, 
random matrices, and statistics (empirical processes).
The recent works of Talagrand concern spin glasses mean fields models. His objective is to give a mathematical foundation to numerous remarkable works of physicists in this domain. Talagrand showed for instance recently the validity of the Parisi formula.

Awards

Peccot-Vimont Prize of the French Collège de France (1980)
Servant Prize of the French Académie des sciences (1985)
Invited Speaker to the International Congress of Mathematicians (Kyoto 1990)
Loève Prize in Probability (1995)
Fermat Prize for mathematical research (1997)
Corresponding member of the French Academy of Sciences (1997) 
Plenary Speaker to the International Congress of Mathematicians (Berlin 1998)
Member of the French Academy of Sciences (2004) 
Chevalier of the Order of the Legion of Honor (2011)
Shaw Prize in mathematics (2019)
Stefan Banach Medal of the Polish Academy of Sciences (2022)

Selected publications

Reference Books

See also
Talagrand's concentration inequality

References

External links
The personal web page of Michel Talagrand

1952 births
Probability theorists
20th-century French mathematicians
21st-century French mathematicians
Living people
Members of the French Academy of Sciences
Chevaliers of the Légion d'honneur
Functional analysts